Giacomo Biffi (13 June 1928 – 11 July 2015) was an Italian Cardinal of the Roman Catholic Church. He was Archbishop Emeritus of Bologna, having served as archbishop there from 1984 to 2003. he was elevated to the cardinalate in 1985.

Biography
Biffi was born in Milan and studied at the seminaries of the Archdiocese of Milan. He was ordained to the priesthood by Cardinal Alfredo Ildefonso Schuster, O.S.B., Archbishop of Milan, on 23 December 1950. From 1951 to 1960, Biffi taught dogmatic theology at the Seminary of Milan, also publishing numerous works on theology, catechetics and meditation. He received a doctorate in theology from the Faculty of Theology at Venegono in 1955; his thesis was entitled: La colpa e la libertà nell'odierna condizione umana.

From 1960 to 1975, he did pastoral work in the Archdiocese of Milan, serving as a parish priest at Santi Martiri Anauniani in Legnano (1960–1969) and later at Sant'Andrea in Milan (1969–1975). Biffi became Episcopal Vicar for Culture in 1974, and a canon theologian of the metropolitan chapter of Milan on 1 February 1975. He also served as director of the Istituto Lombardo di Pastorale and the Commission for the Ambrosian Rite.

On 7 December 1975, Biffi was appointed Auxiliary Bishop of Milan and Titular Bishop of Fidenae by Pope Paul VI. He received his episcopal consecration on 11 January 1976 from Cardinal Giovanni Colombo, with Bishops Bernardo Citterio and Libero Tresoldi serving as co-consecrators. Within the Italian Episcopal Conference, he served on commissions for doctrine, catechetics, culture and liturgy.

Following the death of Enrico Manfredini, Biffi was named Archbishop of Bologna on 19 April 1984 and installed on the following 1 June. He was elected President of the Episcopal Conference of Emilia-Romagna on 7 July 1984. Pope John Paul II created him Cardinal-Priest of Santi Giovanni Evangelista e Petronio in the consistory of 25 May 1985. Biffi preached the Lent spiritual exercises for the pope and Roman Curia in 1989. He retired from the governance of the archdiocese in December 2003 and was succeeded by Carlo Caffarra.

Biffi was one of the cardinal electors who participated in the 2005 papal conclave that selected Pope Benedict XVI. According to a leaked diary, he received one vote on the fourth ballot and subsequently discovered it was of Joseph Ratzinger.

In 2008, he turned 80 and lost the right to participate in future conclaves. He died on 11 July 2015.

Views
In 2000, Biffi told a Bologna conference that the Antichrist would most likely be a prominent philanthropist promoting the ideas of ecumenism, vegetarianism, and pacifism. Many of these predictions originate from the 19th century Russian philosopher Vladimir Solovyov, in whom Biffi is well-studied. Biffi believed that ecumenicism promotes the dilution of Catholic doctrine (a view common among conservative Catholics) and thereby encourages the acceptance of the Antichrist.

He also held views that, while conservative, are in agreement with the Catholic teaching on homosexual acts, freemasonry, and feminism. Biffi has stated that an "ideology of homosexuality" threatens to marginalize whoever disagrees with the homosexual agenda, and that Catholics must prepare for persecution by homosexual activists and their allies.

Cardinal Biffi also once said that the Italian government should favour Catholic immigrants to offset the number of Muslim immigrants to protect Italy's "national identity". He has denounced journalists as "rats".

In 2007, Biffi expounded on many of his views by publishing Memorie e digressioni di un italiano cardinale (Memoirs and digressions of an Italian cardinal).

References

External links

1928 births
2015 deaths
Clergy from Milan
21st-century Italian cardinals
Roman Catholic archbishops of Bologna
20th-century Italian Roman Catholic bishops
21st-century Italian Roman Catholic bishops
Cardinals created by Pope John Paul II
20th-century Italian cardinals